The Ethiopian montane grasslands and woodlands is a montane grasslands and shrublands ecoregion in Ethiopia. It occupies the middle elevations of the Ethiopian Highlands, between the high-altitude Ethiopian montane moorlands and the lower-elevation Ethiopian montane forests.

The ecoregion includes montane grasslands, open woodlands, shrublands, and forest.

Geography
The ecoregion includes the middle elevations of the Ethiopian Highlands, between 1,800 to 3,000 meters elevation. The northern and southern portions of the highlands are separated by the African Rift Valley.

Flora
The natural vegetation includes grassland, open woodlands, shrubland including thorn scrub, and areas of forest, particularly in the more humid southern highlands. Dominant woodland trees include the conifers African juniper (Juniperus procera) and Afrocarpus falcatus, and the broadleaved Hagenia abyssinica. Parts of the highlands have been densely populated for centuries, and the vegetation has been much altered by fire, livestock grazing, conversion to agriculture, and overharvesting firewood and timber. Much of the original woodland and forest is now replaced with grassland and shrubland. In other areas plantations of exotic trees have replaced native plant communities.

The more humid southern highlands, including the Harenna Forest on the south slope of the Bale Mountains, have closed-canopy humid evergreen forests. Lower montane forests grow between 1900 and 2300 meters elevation. Middle montane forests occur between 2300 and 2800 meters. Upper montane forests, which include forests dominated by Hagenia abyssinica and extensive stands of the bamboo Yushania alpina, grow from 2800 to 3250 meters elevation.

Evergreen forests are also found in the Simien Mountains.

Fauna
Several bird and mammal species are near-endemic, dwelling in both the montane grasslands and woodlands and the high-elevation Ethiopian montane moorlands. These include the mammals walia ibex (Capra walie), mountain nyala (Tragelaphus buxtoni), and gelada baboon (Theropithecus gelada). The Bale Mountains vervet (Chlorocebus djamdjamensis) is limited to the upper montane belt of the Harenna Forest and other nearby forests in the southern highlands. Its diet consists mostly of Yushania alpina bamboo shoots.

Near-endemic birds include Rüppell's black chat (Myrmecocichla melaena) and Ankober serin (Crithagra ankoberensis), which also range into the montane moorlands. The lineated pytilia (Pytilia lineata) is the ecoregion's only endemic bird.

Protected areas
4.91% of the ecoregion is in protected areas. Protected areas include Arsi Mountains, Bale Mountains, Borana, Chebera Churchura, Maze, and Simien Mountains national parks, and Eastern Hararghe and Mizan-Teferi controlled hunting areas, in Ethiopia, and Yob Wildlife Refuge in Eritrea.

References

Afrotropical ecoregions
Montane grasslands and shrublands
Ecoregions of Ethiopia
Ecoregions of Eritrea
Ecoregions of Sudan
Afromontane ecoregions
Ethiopian Highlands
Grasslands of Ethiopia